The Vietnamese Football League Second Division is the third tier professional association football league in Vietnam controlled by the Vietnam Football Federation.

History 
A national third tier of Vietnamese association football was first established along with its professionalization in 1995. Among the 10 original clubs of the third tier included the forerunners to Thanh Hóa, Cần Thơ, Đồng Nai, Cà Mau and Lâm Đồng. But after a number of clubs were lost for various reasons – some were promoted to V.League and the others folded – the league contracted the second division in 1997 and continued with the single second-tier division.

The third tier football was reintroduced in 2000 upon creation of fully professional V.League 2. But despite its officially amateur status the league quickly became de facto semi-professional, serving as the cradle of the future V. League members. Since the establishment of associate membership system in 2006 the number of professional clubs holding or actively seeking for this status has grown steadily and reached its peak in 2010 season when 6 full members and 2 former candidates made up to almost half of the league's 18 teams. Through the course of the season this number grew even bigger, to 15 full associate members that formed the core of V.League 3.

2020 season 

15 sides compete in the 2020 season, split into two groups, A and B, of 7 and 8 respectively.

Group A

Group B

Winners

 
3
Sports leagues established in 2001
2000s establishments in Vietnam
Third level football leagues in Asia